The Liouguei Bus Station is a bus station in Liouguei Borough, Liouguei District, Kaohsiung, Taiwan.

History
The bus station building was originally constructed as a hotel by Heitaro Ikeda during the Japanese rule of Taiwan. In July 1934, Ikeda passed away and his daughter and her husband inherited the hotel. After the handover of Taiwan from Japan to the Republic of China in 1945, the couple were sent back to Japan. Liouguei Agricultural Credit Cooperative soon took over the hotel and leased it in 1946. In 1953, the Kaohsiung Transportation Bus Company took over the lease and purchased the hotel in 1961. The renovated the hotel and transform it into the Liouguei Bus Station. On 8 September 2003, the station was listed as historical building by Kaohsiung County Government.

Architecture
The bus station was designed with Japanese architectural style.

References

Buildings and structures in Kaohsiung
Bus stations in Taiwan
Transportation in Kaohsiung
Tourist attractions in Kaohsiung